Åsa Maria Lindhagen, (born 15 May 1980) is a Swedish politician for the Green Party. She served as Minister for Financial Markets from February to November 2021 and previously served as Minister for Gender Equality from 2019 to 2021.

She was a municipal commissioner for the City of Stockholm between 2010 and 2019.

She is openly bisexual.

References

External links

|-

|-

|-

|-

|-

Living people
1980 births
Women government ministers of Sweden
Swedish Ministers for Gender Equality
Swedish LGBT politicians
Bisexual women
Bisexual politicians
Members of the Riksdag 2018–2022
Members of the Riksdag 2022–2026
21st-century Swedish women politicians
Members of the Riksdag from the Green Party
Women members of the Riksdag